On 12 February 2022, Mushtaq Ahmed was killed by a mob in Punjab, Pakistan, after being accused of blasphemy.

Background

Blasphemy is a very serious crime in Pakistan, for which the maximum penalty is death. Pakistan has sentenced people convicted of blasphemy to death, although it had not executed any of them. Some people who were accused of blasphemy were lynched, most recently Priyantha Kumara in Sialkot, Punjab, on 3 December 2021. International and national human rights groups say that blasphemy accusations have often been used to intimidate religious minorities.

Lynching
On the evening of 12 February 2022, in Tulamba, Mian Channu Tehsil, Khanewal District, Punjab, Pakistan, Mushtaq Ahmed was accused by the custodian of a mosque of burning a Quran inside the building. A mob beat the 41-year-old mentally ill man to death using batons, axes and iron rods, and hanged him on a tree. The police, who were greatly outnumbered by the mob, failed in an attempt to arrest Ahmed. Three police officers were injured; the force arrested about 80 men in connection with the killing. Ahmed's funeral was held on 13 February.

References

2022 in Punjab, Pakistan
2022 murders in Pakistan
2020s crimes in Punjab, Pakistan
February 2022 crimes in Asia
February 2022 events in Pakistan
Khanewal District
Lynching deaths in Pakistan
Murder in Punjab, Pakistan